Berit Kjøll (born 30 November 1955) is a Norwegian economist, corporate officer and sports administrator. She is the current president of the Norwegian Confederation of Sports.

Career
Kjøll has held leading administrative positions in Tusenfryd, Flytoget, Steen & Strøm and Telenor, and she was appointed director of Huawei Norway in 2011. She served as chairman of the board of the Norwegian Trekking Association from 2012 to 2018, and has been board member of Hurtigruten ASA and InterOil.

She was voted president of the Norwegian Confederation of Sports in 2019, edging out Sven Mollekleiv with a vote margin of two.

References

1955 births
Living people
Norwegian economists
Businesspeople in telecommunications
Norwegian sports executives and administrators